Salitage Wines (often referred to simply as Salitage) is an Australian winery at Pemberton, in the Pemberton wine region of Western Australia.  Established in 1989 by John and Jenny Horgan, it has been described by prominent Australian wine writer James Halliday as "... the showpiece of Pemberton."

The name Salitage was derived from the first two letters of the 4 Horgan children's names, Sarah, Lisa, Tamara and Gerard.

The winery is still owned by John Horgan following the death of Jenny Horgan in 2013.  Its principal wines are sauvignon blanc, chardonnay and pinot noir.

See also

 Australian wine
 List of wineries in Western Australia
 Western Australian wine

References

Notes

Bibliography

External links
Salitage Wines – official site

Companies established in 1989
Pemberton, Western Australia
Wineries in Western Australia
1989 establishments in Australia